Thiago Maia Alencar (born 23 March 1997), known as Thiago Maia, is a Brazilian professional footballer who plays as a midfielder for Campeonato Brasileiro Série A club Flamengo.

Club career

Santos

Born in Boa Vista, Roraima, Thiago Maia began his career at lowly locals Extremo Norte. In August 2010 he moved to São Paulo, joining São Caetano's youth categories, and later moved to Santos in the following year.

On 25 October 2014 Thiago Maia made his first-team debut, replacing fellow youth graduate Serginho in a 1–1 away draw against Chapecoense for the Série A championship. During the 2015 campaign, he profited from the injury of Alison, establishing himself as a starter from June and earning plaudits for his performances.

On 22 August 2015 Thiago Maia scored his first professional goal, netting the second in a 5–2 home routing of Avaí. On 13 October, after lengthy negotiations, he renewed his contract until 2019.

Thiago Maia became an undisputed starter during the 2016 campaign, partnering Renato at the heart of the midfield. He was also linked to Chelsea, Juventus and Paris Saint-Germain during the year.

Thiago Maia completed his 100th match for Peixe on 4 March 2017, in a 0–1 derby loss against Corinthians. In his Copa Libertadores debut five days later, he started and scored the equalizer in a 1–1 away draw against Sporting Cristal.

Lille

On 15 July 2017, French club Lille reached an agreement with Santos for the transfer of Thiago Maia, for a fee of €14 million, after being signed by the head coach Marcelo Bielsa. He made 37 appearances for the club during the 2017–18 season, scoring one goal.

Flamengo
On 22 January 2020, Maia returned to Brazil, signing with Flamengo on an 18-month loan. An option to make the transfer permanent was included in the deal.

Maia's transfer to Flamengo was made permanent on 13 January 2022.

International career

On 26 December 2014, after featuring regularly with the under-17s, Thiago Maia was called up to the Brazil under-20 side, alongside Santos teammates Gabriel and Caju, for the 2015 South American Youth Football Championship.

On 29 June 2016 Thiago Maia was called up to Olympic team, alongside Santos teammates Gabriel and Zeca, for the 2016 Summer Olympics in Rio de Janeiro. He also became the first athlete from Roraima to appear in the tournament.

Career statistics

Honours
Santos
Campeonato Paulista: 2016

Flamengo
Recopa Sudamericana: 2020
Campeonato Brasileiro Série A: 2020
 Copa do Brasil: 2022
Supercopa do Brasil: 2020, 2021
Campeonato Carioca: 2020, 2021
Copa Libertadores: 2022
Brazil U23
Olympic Gold Medal: 2016
Individual
Campeonato Paulista Team of the year: 2016

References

External links
Santos FC official profile 

1997 births
Living people
People from Boa Vista, Roraima
Brazilian footballers
Association football midfielders
Campeonato Brasileiro Série A players
Ligue 1 players
Santos FC players
Lille OSC players
CR Flamengo footballers
Copa Libertadores-winning players
2015 South American Youth Football Championship players
Olympic footballers of Brazil
Footballers at the 2016 Summer Olympics
Brazil youth international footballers
Brazil under-20 international footballers
Olympic gold medalists for Brazil
Olympic medalists in football
Medalists at the 2016 Summer Olympics
Brazilian expatriate footballers
Brazilian expatriate sportspeople in France
Expatriate footballers in France
Sportspeople from Roraima